The Can Marfà Knitwear Museum, located in Mataró (Spain). Part of the Mataró Museum it is devoted to the knitting and hosiery industry. It is situated in one of the three-storey warehouses of the former Marfà factory in Mataró, the most important Knitted fabric factory in Spain before 1936.

The facility has 1,800 m2 distributed over three floors.

Ground floor: The temporary exhibition area				      
The ground floor houses the history of textile industry, technology, design and fashion. It is the area of temporary exhibitions.

First floor: Mataró, the capital of knitwear
The permanent exhibition presents more than one hundred industrial objects explaining the knitwear manufacturing process in Catalonia from the 18th century to present day: Machinery, tools, clothing, advertising and documents, aiming to highlight one of the most important collections of its kind in Europe.

Thematic areas
The exhibition is arranged in seven thematic areas:
 Audiovisual introduction: Overview of the characteristics of the knitwear industry in Mataró.
 From Fiber to Mesh: The manufacturing process of knitwear: Spinning, weaving, design, cutting, Finishing and Packaging and labeling.
 The early years of knitting: From traditional to mechanical looms.
 The industrialization of knitwear: Technological innovation and labor force in the textile factories. The social and urban impact. Singularity of the knitting industry for the city of Mataró.
 Fashion, fantasy and sport: The changes in the patterns of clothing, the influence of fashion and the upcoming of new products and technological innovations.
 From autarky to expansion of the textile sector: The drive to the construction of knitwear machinery. The supplier industry. The impact of the nylon revolution.
 The future of the textile industry: The importance of design and the impact of new technologies.

Gallery first floor

Second floor: Warehouse of textile collections

The second floor houses documentation, preservation and research areas and displays a selection of clothing items from the 1960s to the 1980s.

References

Barcelona Provincial Council Local Museum Network
Mataró
Local museums in Spain
Textile museums in Catalonia
Industry museums in Spain